The Abercarn colliery disaster was a catastrophic explosion within the Prince of Wales Colliery in the Welsh village of Abercarn (then in the county of Monmouthshire), on 11 September 1878, killing 268 men and boys (though an exact number of casualties remains unknown). The cause was assumed to have been the ignition of firedamp by a safety lamp. The disaster is the third worst for loss of life to occur within the South Wales Coalfield.

Explosion
Shortly after midday on 11 September 1878, with 325 men and boys working underground, a large explosion ripped through the Prince of Wales Colliery. The colliery’s steam whistle blew, signalling that an emergency was underway, drawing colliers and the families of those trapped to the pit head.

The explosion caused significant damage to the mine’s roadways and to the bottom of the main shaft. Several fires ignited the coal seams and supporting timber structures, filling the mine with smoke.

Rescue attempts
A rescue team entered the main shaft but damage meant the winding gear could reach only  down. John Harris climbed down guide ropes and rescued several men. After several hours in the pit, the rescue team was withdrawn over concerns of further explosions. In all, some 90 colliers were saved.

 from the main pit, another rescue team ventured into a shallow downcast or ventilation shaft, but were ordered to withdraw due to the likelihood of another explosion happening. Only 12 bodies were retrieved, leaving over 250 men and boys within the mine.

Flooding of the mine
Due to the ongoing fires within the mine, the colliery owners, with support from the government, sealed the mine and flooded it. The mine did not reopen until 1882.

Gallantry awards
On 16 August 1879, Queen Victoria conferred the Albert Medal for Lifesaving to the following rescuers, all from Abercarn:
Albert Medals of the First Class
Henry Davies, collier
John Harris, mason
Albert Medals of the Second Class
William Simons, pumpman
Thomas Herbert, pumpman
Miles Moseley, overman
Charles Preen, collier
William Walters, collier
Lewis Harris, overman

External links
 Sale of rescuer's medal 
 Memorial
 List of casualties

References

1878 in Wales
Coal mining disasters in Wales
Underground mines in Wales
1878 disasters in the United Kingdom
19th century in Monmouthshire